Vygonichi is an urban-type settlement and the administrative center of Vygonichsky District, Bryansk Oblast, Russia. Population:

References

Notes

Sources

Urban-type settlements in Bryansk Oblast
Trubchevsky Uyezd